Bluecrest Wellness is a privately run health screening company founded in the UK in 2012 and based in Worthing, West Sussex.

Operations and services 
Bluecrest offer a range of screenings in the UK and Ireland to both consumer and corporate clients; clinics are set up at mobile sites across the country.

Food manufacturer Danone UK offers free annual health checks to all of its staff via Bluecrest. Hertfordshire County Council makes the offer to all its employees but through a salary sacrifice scheme. Other clients include Capita.

Awards
The company was named Healthcare and Wellbeing Provider of Year in the Workplace Savings & Benefits Awards 2016.

See also 

 Exertris
 Vacuactivus

References

Private medicine in the United Kingdom
Private providers of NHS services
Companies based in West Sussex
2012 establishments in England